Drigh Colony Railway Station (Sindhi: ڊرگ ڪالوني ريلوي اسٽيشن) is located in Shah Faisal Colony, Karachi, Pakistan near Jinnah International Airport.

Gallery

See also
 List of railway stations in Pakistan
 Pakistan Railways

References

External links

Railway stations in Karachi
Railway stations on Karachi Circular Railway